Ancylosis morbosella is a species of snout moth in the genus Ancylosis. It was described by Staudinger in 1879. It is found in France and Russia.

The wingspan is 21–26 mm.

References

Moths described in 1879
morbosella
Moths of Europe